Penrod Nunatak is a nunatak 2 nautical miles (3.7 km) northwest of Abbey Nunatak, lying at the west side of Reedy Glacier just north of the mouth of Kansas Glacier. Mapped by United States Geological Survey (USGS) from surveys and U.S. Navy air photos, 1960–64. Named by Advisory Committee on Antarctic Names (US-ACAN) for Jack R. Penrod, builder with the Byrd Station winter party, 1957.

Nunataks of Marie Byrd Land